KBCT may refer to:
 Boca Raton Airport, the airport serving Boca Raton, Florida assigned the ICAO code KBCT
 KWBT (FM), the Waco, Texas radio station which previously had the callsign KBCT